Hyloxalus peculiaris is a species of frogs in the family Dendrobatidae. It is endemic to Ecuador where it is only known from its type locality, "Pailas" in the Morona-Santiago Province, on the eastern slope of the Andes.
Its natural habitats are cloud forests. It is threatened by habitat loss, and the forest at the type locality was already fragmented in 1996.

References

peculiaris
Amphibians of the Andes
Amphibians of Ecuador
Endemic fauna of Ecuador
Amphibians described in 1991
Taxonomy articles created by Polbot